Sadia Ghaffar is a Pakistani actress and model known for her appearance in Urdu television serials. She is known for her role as Shehzadi in Kis Din Mera Viyah Howay Ga and as Ramsha in Aisi Hai Tanhai.

Television

References

External links

Living people
1993 births